No Place of Grace: Antimodernism and the Transformation of American Culture, 1880–1920 is a history book written by Jackson Lears about American antimodernism at the turn of the 20th century.

References 

 
 
 
 
 
 
 
 
 
 
 
 
 
 
 
 
 
 
 

Related

External links 

 
 Retrospective

1981 non-fiction books
Pantheon Books books
American history books
History books about the 20th century
History books about the 19th century